Agnew station is a former railway station in Santa Clara County, California, in what is now the city of Santa Clara. The station was built in 1877 and originally served the narrow-gauge South Pacific Coast Railroad. Landowner Abram Agnew donated  to the railroad to build a station and laid out the settlement that would become known as Agnew's Village. (The station was similarly referred to as Agnew's.) The line and station came under the ownership of Southern Pacific Railroad in 1887. The station building was purchased by the California Central Model Railroad Club in 1963 after passenger and freight services ceased — the rail line remains active. The building was made a City of Santa Clara Historic Landmark in 1988.

References

External links
California Central Model Railroad Club
Our Depot

Buildings and structures in Santa Clara, California
Former Southern Pacific Railroad stations in California
Railway stations in Santa Clara County, California
Railway stations in the United States opened in 1877
Repurposed railway stations in the United States